Johan H. Benthin (1936–2006) was an artist from Denmark. He mostly did painting on canvas, but also did relief sculpture, murals, and other works. His work is in permanent collections in the Netherlands and the United States.

Benthin was a Latter-day Saint.  Beginning in 1974, he was the first president on the Copenhagen Denmark Stake of the Church of Jesus Christ of Latter-day Saints (LDS Church). He was stake president in 1976 when LDS Church president Spencer W. Kimball toured the Church of Our Lady; it was to Benthin that Kimball gave the instruction, "I want you to tell every prelate in Denmark that they do not hold the keys. I HOLD THE KEYS."

Benthin opened a studio in Italy in 1964. For most of the 1970s and 1980s he worked primarily in Germany. He then moved to Spain. He also for a time lived in India, where he served as president of the LDS Church district based in Bangalore.

See also
The Church of Jesus Christ of Latter-day Saints in Denmark

References 

Zeitzug article on Benthin
Deseret News Church Almanac, 2010 edition, p. 473.
"Ancient Voices, Modern Light", Ensign, December 2000
facebook posting of Deccan Herald article about Benthin
The Hindu Oct. 13, 2006
The Hindu Sep. 13, 2004
 

1936 births
2006 deaths
Danish leaders of the Church of Jesus Christ of Latter-day Saints
Latter Day Saint artists
Danish expatriate sportspeople in Germany
Danish expatriates in Spain
Danish expatriates in India
Artists from Copenhagen